Rear Admiral Marcus Frederick Bonser,  (born 7 August 1952) is a retired flag rank officer of the Royal Australian Navy. His final posting was as Head of the Military Justice Implementation Team for the Australian Defence Force.

Early life
Mark Bonser was born in Sydney on 7 August 1952. He attended high school at Manly Boys High School and Macksville High School.

Naval career
In 1971, Bonser joined the Royal Australian Navy (RAN) and commenced training at the Royal Australian Naval College. He graduated from the college in 1973, then undertook six weeks training with the Royal Navy, before joining the ship's company of the aircraft carrier . Bonser completed his bridge watchkeeping certification aboard the carrier. From 1980 until 1982, Bonser served as the commanding officer of the patrol boat .

In 1982, after a short period aboard , Bonser was sent to the United Kingdom for Principal Warfare Officer training. After qualifying as an Anti-Submarine Warfare Officer in 1983, Bonser served on exchange to the Royal Navy until 1985 as an officer aboard the destroyers , then . While aboard Torrens, he was promoted to the rank of commander. In 1988, Bonser was assigned to Maritime Headquarters Sydney in the positions of Fleet Programming Officer and Commander Operations.

He was awarded the Commendation for Distinguished Service for his actions during the deployment. After returning from the Persian Gulf in 1991, Bonser attended the Joint Services Staff College.

From April 1992 until 1993, Bonser was the commanding officer of the frigate . During this period, Sydney was deployed to the Red Sea in support of United Nations sanctions against Iraq. During 1994, Bonser was awarded the Conspicuous Service Cross for this deployment, and in December, he was promoted to captain. After promotion, Bonser was posted to Maritime Headquarters again; initially as Chief Staff Officer Operations, then serving as the Chief Staff Officer C3I. In January 1996, he transferred to the Australian Defence Force Headquarters as the Director Combat Force Development (Sea).

From October 1997 to mid-1999, Bonser was the commanding officer of the frigate . In July 1999, Bonser was promoted to commodore and assigned as Commander Northern Command. At the start of 2001, Bonser became the Director General Command and Support Systems in the Defence Materiel Organisation. Bonser was promoted to rear admiral in July 2001, and assigned as Director General of Coastwatch. In June 2002, he was appointed Commander Australian Theatre. In 2003, Bonser was made an Officer of the Order of Australia for his leadership during the invasion of Iraq.

From May 2004 to January 2006, Bonser was the Commander Australian Defence College. During this period, he was appointed on 7 October 2005 as head of the Military Justice Response Coordination Team, then later that year as head of the Military Justice Implementation Team.

References

|-

1952 births
Military personnel from New South Wales
Australian military personnel of the Gulf War
Australian military personnel of the Vietnam War
Graduates of the Royal Australian Naval College
Living people
Officers of the Order of Australia
People from Sydney
Recipients of the Commendation for Distinguished Service
Recipients of the Conspicuous Service Cross (Australia)
Recipients of the Meritorious Unit Citation
Royal Australian Navy admirals